{{Infobox government agency
| native_name_a =  मंत्रालय वित्तविभाग महाराष्ट्र शासन| type = ministry
| name = Department of Finance Government of Maharashtra
| native_name = 
| seal = File:Seal of Maharashtra.png
| seal_width = 200
| seal_caption = Seal of the state of Maharashtra
| logo = 
| logo_width = 
| logo_caption = 
| picture              = Mantralay of Mumbai, Administrative Headquarters 03.jpg
| picture_caption      = Building of Administrative Headquarters of Mumbai
| picture_width = 
| jurisdiction =  Maharashtra
| headquarters = Mantralay, Mumbai
| region_code = IN
| minister1_name = Devendra Fadnavis| minister1_pfo = Deputy Chief Minister of Maharashtra
| deputyminister1_name = Vacant, TBDsince 29 June 2022
| deputyminister1_pfo = Minister of State
| child1_agency = 
| child2_agency = 
| website = 
| formed = 
| employees = 
| budget = 
| chief1_name = Shri Manoj Saunik (IAS)| chief1_position = Additional Chief Secretary	
| chief2_name = 
| chief2_position = 
| parent_department = Government of Maharashtra
}}

The Ministry of Finance is a ministry of the Government of Maharashtra. It is responsible for preparing annual plans for the development of Maharashtra state.

The Ministry is headed by a Cabinet level Minister. Devendra Fadnavis''' is Current Minister of Finance.

Head office

List of Cabinet Ministers

List of Ministers of State

List of Principal Secretary

See All Ministry 
Chief Minister's Office (Maharashtra)
Deputy Chief Minister's Office (Maharashtra)
Ministry of General Administration (Maharashtra)
Ministry of Information and Public Relations (Maharashtra)
Ministry of Information Technology (Maharashtra)
Ministry of Law and Judiciary (Maharashtra)
Ministry of Home Affairs (Maharashtra)
Ministry of Public Works (Excluding Public Undertakings) (Maharashtra)
Ministry of Public Works (Including Public Undertakings) (Maharashtra)
Ministry of Finance (Maharashtra)
Ministry of Planning (Maharashtra)
Ministry of Revenue (Maharashtra)
Ministry of State Excise (Maharashtra)
Ministry of Special Assistance (Maharashtra)
Ministry of Social Justice (Maharashtra)
Ministry of Forests Department (Maharashtra)
Ministry of Environment and Climate Change (Maharashtra)
Ministry of Energy (Maharashtra)
Ministry of Water Resources (Maharashtra)
Ministry of Command Area Development (Maharashtra)
Ministry of Public Health (Maharashtra)
Ministry of Housing (Maharashtra)
Ministry of Urban Development (Maharashtra)
Ministry of Rural Development (Maharashtra)
Ministry of Labour (Maharashtra)
Ministry of Co-operation (Maharashtra)
Ministry of Marketing (Maharashtra)
Ministry of Transport (Maharashtra)
Ministry of Industries (Maharashtra)
Ministry of Mining Department (Maharashtra)
Ministry of Textiles (Maharashtra)
Ministry of Protocol (Maharashtra)
Ministry of Tourism (Maharashtra)
Ministry of Cultural Affairs (Maharashtra)
Ministry of Marathi Language (Maharashtra)
Ministry of Water Supply (Maharashtra)
Ministry of Soil and Water Conservation (Maharashtra)
Ministry of Parliamentary Affairs (Maharashtra)
Ministry of Sanitation (Maharashtra)
Ministry of Woman and Child Development (Maharashtra)
Ministry of School Education (Maharashtra)
Ministry of Medical Education (Maharashtra)
Ministry of Higher and Technical Education (Maharashtra)
Ministry of Skill Development and Entrepreneurship (Maharashtra)
Ministry of Sports and Youth Welfare (Maharashtra)
Ministry of Ex. Servicemen Welfare (Maharashtra)
Ministry of Agriculture (Maharashtra)
Ministry of Food, Civil Supplies and Consumer Protection (Maharashtra)
Ministry of Food and Drug Administration (Maharashtra)
Ministry of Animal Husbandry Department (Maharashtra)
Ministry of Dairy Development (Maharashtra)
Ministry of Horticulture (Maharashtra)
Ministry of Fisheries Department (Maharashtra)
Ministry of Ports Development (Maharashtra)
Ministry of Disaster Management (Maharashtra)
Ministry of Relief & Rehabilitation (Maharashtra)
Ministry of Khar Land Development (Maharashtra)
Ministry of Earthquake Rehabilitation (Maharashtra)
Ministry of Employment Guarantee (Maharashtra)
Ministry of Minority Development and Aukaf (Maharashtra)
Ministry of Majority Welfare Development (Maharashtra)
Ministry of Tribal Development (Maharashtra)
Ministry of Vimukta Jati (Maharashtra)
Ministry of Nomadic Tribes (Maharashtra)
Ministry of Other Backward Classes (Maharashtra)
Ministry of Other Backward Bahujan Welfare (Maharashtra)
Ministry of Special Backward Classes Welfare (Maharashtra)
Ministry of Socially and Educationally Backward Classes (Maharashtra)

References 

Government of Maharashtra
Government ministries of Maharashtra